Jay Delsing (born October 17, 1960) is an American professional golfer.

Delsing was born in St. Louis, Missouri. He played college golf at UCLA with Corey Pavin, Steve Pate, Tom Pernice Jr., and Duffy Waldorf.  He graduated from UCLA in 1983 with a degree in Economics.

Delsing is winless in 565 career PGA Tour starts.  His best finishes on the PGA Tour are a T2 at the 1993 New England Classic and the 1995 FedEx St. Jude Classic.

Delsing's father, Jim, was an outfielder in Major League Baseball for the Chicago White Sox, New York Yankees, St. Louis Browns, Detroit Tigers, and Kansas City A's from 1948 to 1960.

Professional wins (3)

Buy.com Tour wins (2)

Buy.com Tour playoff record (1–0)

Other wins (1)
1993 Jerry Ford Invitational (tie with Donnie Hammond, and Jim Thorpe)

Results in major championships

Note: Delsing never played in the Masters Tournament.

CUT = missed the half-way cut
"T" = tied

See also
1984 PGA Tour Qualifying School graduates
1987 PGA Tour Qualifying School graduates
1988 PGA Tour Qualifying School graduates
1989 PGA Tour Qualifying School graduates
1996 PGA Tour Qualifying School graduates
1998 PGA Tour Qualifying School graduates
2003 PGA Tour Qualifying School graduates

External links

American male golfers
UCLA Bruins men's golfers
PGA Tour golfers
PGA Tour Champions golfers
Golfers from St. Louis
Golf writers and broadcasters
Sportspeople from St. Louis
1960 births
Living people